Nate Doss is a former professional disc golfer who won three world championships (2005, 2007, 2011).  With his win in 2011, Doss became only the second person with three MPO world championships, after  Ken Climo's 12.  In addition to his three world championships, Doss became the first Discraft sponsored player to win Disc Golf's other prestigious event, the United States Disc Golf Championship, in 2008. After retiring from the game in 2018 he, along with his wife Valarie Jenkins (herself a four-time world champion disc golfer), began a new career as a brewer, launching Bevel Craft Brewing. Doss also provides live color commentary on the Disc Golf Network.

Amateur career
Doss first played disc golf when he was seven years old, and by the time he was eleven, he was hooked.  Success wasn't too far behind.  In 1998, at the age of thirteen, Doss was invited to the Amateur World Championships, held in Appleton, Wisconsin, by Steady Ed.  He finished seventh in the Juniors < 16 division.  In 1999, he went to Kansas City, Missouri and won the same division he took seventh in the year before.  He turned pro the next year.

Professional career

2008 season
The 2008 season was possibly Doss's best season.  While he won only one National Tour (NT) event, he also won the most prestigious disc golf tournament of the year, the United States Disc Golf Championship.  This win gave him his largest payday as a professional disc golfer: $12,000.  Other top finishes of the year include runner-up finishes in two majors: The Scandinavian Open, held in Skellefteå, Sweden, and the World Championships, held in Kalamazoo and Battle Creek, Michigan.  His runner-up finish in the world championships was his fourth straight top two finish in this tournament, a run bested only by  Ken Climo's nine straight wins.

In addition to the National Tour wins, Doss won two smaller tournaments and finished second in the National Tour Series.  In just 14 events on the year, his earnings were $27,545, giving him an average of $1,967.5 per tournament attended.  He finished the year with a 1036 rating, which was a stellar season by any measure.

2009 season
The 2009 season was very much an up and down year by Doss's standards.  Perhaps the greatest disappointment of the season came when he finished 12th at the World Championships, his worst finish there since he placed 18th in 2004.  This finish ended his four-year run of top two finishes.  On the upside, Doss won six tournaments, including two National Tour stops.  He also finished on the lead card at the USDGC, taking fourth and his largest paycheck of the year.  Doss wrapped up the year earning $18,088 in 23 tournaments, for an average of $786.43 per tournament.  He finished the year rated 1033.

2010 season
The 2010 season was another underwhelming year.  Out of 22 events played, Doss won only two, the Brent Hambrick Memorial Open, a National Tour Event, and the Pittsburgh Flying Disc Open, an A-Tier event.  Despite only winning twice, Doss finished in the top three in several National Tour events as well as Majors.  Notable third-place finishes include the Steady Ed Memorial Masters Cup (NT), Beaver State Fling (NT), Japan Open (M), and the Minnesota Majestic (NT).  Doss also finished fifth at worlds.  His end of the year totals include $19,512 earned in 22 tournaments, for an average of $886.91 per tournament.  His end of the year rating was 1036.

2011 season
The 2011 season was Doss's second full season as a full-time professional.  It was a hallmark season in a number of ways.  First, this season marked the first time in his career that his Player Rating eclipsed the 1040 mark, peaking at 1042 as of the October 25th update, as well as the season ending update.  In addition to one National Tour win, Doss won his third career World Championship in 2011, giving him sole possession of second place on the career world titles list. Another big win on the year was the inaugural World Disc Golf Match Play Championships, which he took home $5,000 for. 2011 was a banner year for Doss, as he set or broke many of his personal bests.

2011 Worlds
In 2011, the 2011 Disc Golf World Championships took place in Doss's backyard - Santa Cruz, California.  One of the courses included in the championship, DeLaveaga DGC, was the first course Doss played on, at seven years of age.  Doss beat second-place finishers Josh Anthon and Will Schusterick by seven throws for his third world championship, his first since 2007.

Professional wins

Notable wins

Major, NT playoff record (2-2)

Summary

Annual statistics

*At Year End

Equipment
Doss is sponsored by Discraft. He has a number of signature discs (marked with *), and commonly carries the following discs in competition:

Drivers
Force (ESP, Ti, Z)*
Nuke (Ti)*
Predator (Z)
Pulse (ESP)
XL (X)

Midranges
Buzzz (Ti)*
Drone (Ti)
Hawk (Z)
Wasp (Z)

Putters
Challenger (D, Ti)

References

External links
Nate Doss Website
Nate Doss PDGA Player Page

American disc golfers
Living people
1985 births
Sportspeople from Santa Cruz, California